Deborah Dugan is an American executive who was the first female president and CEO of the Recording Academy, which presents the Grammy Awards, in 2019 and 2020. She served as the president of Disney Publishing Worldwide from 2002 to 2006, having been at the company a total eight years, and CEO of Entertainment Rights North America from 2007 to 2009, and CEO of (RED) from 2011 to 2019. In April of 2022, she became CEO of diabetes nonprofit Beyond Type 1.

She has contributed to the Huffington Post and Forbes.com and appeared on Mad Money with Jim Cramer, PBS News Hour, and NPR's All Things Considered, among other outlets. Dugan has been the co-chair of the storytelling nonprofit the Moth since 2008.

Early life and career
Dugan grew up on Long Island and in Florida. Her father was Thomas Dugan, who worked for a time in the U.S. Justice Department and served as inspector general of the Peace Corps under Sargent Shriver, and her mother, a homemaker. Thomas passed away when his daughter was six, and she worked from a young age. She attended the University of Florida, majoring in education, making the dean's list, and graduated. She then went to and graduated from the University of Utah Law School. Dugan became a corporate attorney on Wall Street while doing pro-bono work for Volunteer Lawyers for the Arts.

Career
She transitioned to working at SBK Records, where she worked with artists like Wilson Phillips then when the company merged with EMI/Capitol Records, she became its executive vice president working with musicians like Paul McCartney, George Harrison, Tracy Chapman, and Joan Baez. She then worked for Disney Publishing Worldwide for eight years, becoming its president in 2002, where she oversaw 275 magazines, including Discover and Disney Magazine, and published more than 4,000 new books, generating $1.8 billion in global retail sales. 

Dugan then worked for British media company Entertainment Rights as president and CEO of the North America division, restructuring it and growing its biggest content work, one year, 27 percent. She was senior advisor to the Tribeca Enterprises Board from 2009 to 2011,  where she evaluated and executed revenue streams for Robert DeNiro and Jane Rosenthal's company and rebranded its school.

CEO of (RED)
In 2011, Dugan started work as CEO of (RED), co-founded by Bono and Bobby Shriver after interviewing for a job that wasn't the right fit. The nonprofit aims to enlist the help of private companies and citizens in the global fight to eradicate AIDS in Sub-Saharan Africa (it now tasks itself to also combat the effects of COVID-19). She rearranged her life to travel to Africa, among other things, and, under her tenure, (RED) began to partner with Coca-Cola, Salesforce, Bank of America, Vespa, Snapchat, Nickelodeon, Moschino, Jeremy Scott, Latin America's telecommunications companies Claro and Telcel, German multinational SAP, among others. Notable campaigns under Dugan also include the Super Bowl, Jimmy Kimmel Live, Beats by Dre, Starbucks, and Amazon. During this time the organization, with a team of 25 in New York, reached $660 million for the Global Fund and impacted the lives of more than 110 million.

From 2011 to 2015, Dugan also contributed to Huffington Post, in 2017 and 2018, to Forbes.com. In 2017 she was awarded PTTOW!'s Nelson Mandela Changemaker Award.

Recording Academy presidency and settlement
In response to the outrage over the low female representation at the 2018 Grammys and then-CEO/President Neil Portnow's comment that women musicians needed to "step up" in order to achieve parity, an 18-person task force led by Time's Up co-founder Tina Tchen was created to study the Recording Academy's problems and make recommendations. After a search, on May 8, 2019, its board of trustees confirmed that Dugan would be its next president and CEO. She began her tenure on August 1, 2019, succeeding Portnow. Dugan was the first woman president of the $60M nonprofit, and her contract was for three years.

On January 16, 2020, Dugan was relieved of her duties and placed on administrative leave, accused of bullying her assistant, whom she inherited from Portnow, resulting in the assistant taking a leave of absence. Recording Academy Chairman Harvey Mason Jr. took over as interim president and CEO. In response, Dugan made claims that the organization was complicit in corruption, citing "voting irregularities, financial mismanagement, 'exorbitant and unnecessary' legal bills, and conflicts of interest involving members of the academy's board, executive committee and outside lawyers". On March 2, 2020, the Recording Academy announced that it had officially fired her. A letter was sent to its members informing them of the action taken by its board of trustees. The organization also tightened their conflict of interest rules that June.

In April 2021, the Recording Academy eliminated its secret voting committees that existed for 28 years.
Within two months, it had settled with Dugan for an undisclosed amount.

Awards
 Forbess 100 Most Powerful Women, Social Entrepreneurism issue
 Elles Top Women to Help Change the World
 Innovation Fellow, Columbia University Business School
 Tribeca Disruptor Awards Fellow
 PTTOW!'s Nelson Mandela Changemaker Award

Board memberships and associations
Dugan is on the board of the Moth, co-chairing it since 2008, and the London-and-Nairobi-based creative nonprofit Girl Effect. She is also on the board of advisors of CITYarts. 

Dugan is a member of Association of American Publishers, MPA – The Association of Magazine Media, and International Academy of Television Arts and Sciences.

External links
 Twitter account
 Dugan on Mad Money with Jim Cramer

References

  (interim)

Presidents of The Recording Academy
HIV/AIDS activists
American music industry executives
Living people
Year of birth missing (living people)
American women chief executives
Activists from New York City
Businesspeople from New York City
20th-century American businesspeople
20th-century American businesswomen
21st-century American businesspeople
21st-century American businesswomen
Gender equality
Sexual harassment in the United States
People from Long Island